Gran Hermano VIP 4 was the fourth season of the reality television Gran Hermano VIP series.  The series was  launched in January 2016 on Telecinco. Jordi González returned to host the series, and Sandra Barneda was confirmed as the host of the weekly Debate. On the Grand Finale of Gran Hermano 16 it was officially confirmed GHVIP would start in January.

Housemates 
The first official housemates of the season were announced on the finale of Gran Hermano 16, TV personality Rosa Benito and fortune teller Rappel. The rest of the housemates are being confirmed regularly at some of the channel's TV programs. The cast includes relatives of previous contestants, like Rosa Benito, mother of Gran Hermano VIP 2 former contestant Rosario Mohedano and Laura Matamoros, Kiko Matamoros' daughter, also from Season 2. Laura is also set to coexist with her step-brother Javier Tudela.

Nominations table

Notes

 : Because of the weekly task, the loser team, the Faraophs, was not able to nominate. 
 : Alejandro won the power of salvation and he saved Javier which meant that Fran and Julián were nominated as well. 
 : Because of the weekly task, the loser team, the Red Door, was not able to nominate.
 : Charlotte was exempt from nominations as she was a new housemate.
 : This week both teams passed the weekly task and for this reason all contestants were able to nominate.
 : This week the privileged team was able to nominate.
 : Gran Hermano proposed to the housemates to nominate themselves or let the public nominate instead. The housemates let the public nominate.
 : Because of the weekly task, Belén won the right to nominate automatically a housemate, Julián won the right to not nominate and Sema won the right to give three extra points in the nominations.
 : Charlotte was automatically nominated by Gran Hermano due to inappropriate behavior towards Carlos.
 : The public gave the right to Carlos, Fran and Laura M. to save a nominated housemate. They saved Fran.
 : In this round each housemate could have the chance to win three extra points in the nominations. Alejandro was the only one to win them.
 : Dani and Laura C. were exempt from nominations as they were new housemates.
 : Dani and Rappel won the power of salvation and they saved Dani which meant that Carlos was nominated as well.
 : Lines were opened to vote for the winner. The housemate with fewest votes would be evicted.

Nominations total received

Debate: Blind results

Repechage 
The public voting will decide the top ex-housemates to officially return to the Gran Hermano VIP house as official housemates.

The repechage was officially announced on Day  (February 21, 2016). All the evicted housemates (Fran, Julius, Lucía, Javier and Liz) are there. All of them are up for returning to the house.

Replacements 
The program revealed 4 possible candidates to join the VIP house to replace Julián and Belén, only 2 of them succeed in doing and the audience will vote for their favorite to enter the VIP house. The candidates are: Laura Campos (Gran Hermano 12 winner), Dani Santos (Gran Hermano 12+1 housemate), Miguel Frigenti (journalist) and Samira Salomé (MYHYV participant).

Nomination twists
The weekly budget challenge directly affects nominations this season. Each week, the housemates will be divided in two different teams, each with his own different challenge. In orden to be able to nominate this week, the team must pass his challenge. If no one of the teams pass the challenge, both team would nominate.

Week 1 : Pharaophs and slaves
On the premiere of Gran Hermano VIP 4, the housemates were divided into two teams whose main captains were chosen by the winner of the previous season Belén Esteban, Julius' team and Belén's team. The audience decided which team would be Pharaophs and which team would be slaves. On the Weekly Debate, the public decided that Javier should become a Pharaoph and he had the power to send one member of the Pharaophs team to the slaves team, he chose Alejandro.

The Pharaophs were unable to finish the challenge so they can't nominate the first week.

 Teams

The one with the fewest votes of the public have to nominate first. The order of nominations was: Lucía, Belén, Sema, Liz, Alejandro, Rosa and Fran.

Week 2 : Time & Space
During the second gala, one by one the housemates should pick a red door or a black door. If they pick the red door, they will spend the week doing luxurious and funny activities. If they choose the black door, they will be doing nasty and boring activities.
Carmen, who pick the red door, quit the game on Day 8. On the Debate, because of a dispute between members of the red door, Carlos and Lucia changed teams by order of the teams. 

The one with the fewest votes of the public have to nominate first. The order of nominations was: Julius, Carlos, Raquel, Alejandro, Javier and Laura.

Week 3: Bees & Drones
This week the people had to choose between the red door and black. Drones (black door) had to collect pollen heavy activities, several participants injured. Bees (Red Door) had to take care of the baby bees. In Sunday's debate Bees Javier decided to leave the other team for his knee injury and Drones Liz decided to leave.

Week 4: Years 70's 
This week the inhabitants of the house had to agree as would be the equipment, Alejandro, Bethlehem, Carlos, Charlotte, Javier, Lucia and Sema chose the Red Gate where they had to develop two choreographies and the public decide if testing or exceed not through the App Big Brother. The rest of the participants had to pedal 1,000 kilometers a caravan and make 2 secret missions that would help them build km. In Sunday's debate audience he decided that Rosa became part of the Artists and she chose to join the fans to Alexander.

Week 5: Privilege and Fear 
On the 29th the public chose 3 contestants through the application to the members of the red door that would be i favor, Laura (21%), Javier (18%) and Carlos (16%) were found to be top rated. The rest of the contestants had to endure phobias that privileged chose. The 09 day of February were told participants that only privileged in may nominate as only they passed the test.

Week 6: Great Spa 
Contestants become the directors and employees of the most luxurious hotel catering, health and wellness. Thus, they must be available to its customers and their tips depend on that stand the test.

Customers will have their own suite, eat alone and may ask whatever they want to whomever they want. Of course, among them there will be an employee-client relationship.

After each service will give customers €10, €5 or €0 or complain directly (which would lose 5 € of the total pot), depending on the quality of service. It is a personal tip that everyone will keep until the end of the test. If we all manage to raise €1000 will exceed the test.

The hotel will have a minimum service: a cook, a maid, a person receiving the waiter and a manager. The others will be alert because customers can claim them for any service.

Managers are always available and enforce hours hotel service. The cleaning staff will collect and clean the rooms and manage the laundry. The reception team will serve customers 24 hours a day. Cooks are responsible for thinking and preparing menus for lunch and dinner with two options first and second. The bartender will prepare breakfast, take note of the requests for lunch and dinner and immediately attend to any customers request day or night. The head of the SPA will manage massages, pedicures and manicures.

The functions have been distributed as follows:

Week 7: APPs

Week 8: Videoclips 
The housemates have to make 2 videoclips in two groups, the songs are:
 Joey Montana (Picky)
 Morat (Cómo te atreves)

Week 9: Don Quijote

Ratings

"Galas" 
 On Thursdays.

"Debates"

"Limit: 48 Horas"

See also
 Main article about the show

2010 Spanish television seasons
Gran Hermano (Spanish TV series) seasons